Thomas Sebastiaan Braat (born 14 November 1992) is a Dutch international cricketer who made his debut for the Dutch national side in July 2012. He is a right-arm pace bowler.

The younger brother of Marloes Braat, who played for the Dutch women's team, Braat was born in Vlaardingen, South Holland. He represented the Dutch under-19s at the 2009 and 2010 editions of the ICC Europe Under-19 Championships, and also at the 2009 Under-19 World Cup Qualifier. Braat made his senior debut for the Netherlands in July 2012, in an Intercontinental Cup fixture against the United Arab Emirates (which held first-class status). He played a second Intercontinental Cup game the following year, against Ireland.

In July 2019, he was named in the Dutch squad for the Twenty20 International (T20I) series against the United Arab Emirates. He made his T20I debut for the Netherlands against the United Arab Emirates on 5 August 2019. In April 2020, he was one of seventeen Dutch-based cricketers to be named in the team's senior squad.

References

External links

1992 births
Living people
Dutch cricketers
People from Vlaardingen
Netherlands Twenty20 International cricketers
Sportspeople from South Holland